The Neelum–Jhelum Hydropower Plant was part of a run-of-the-river hydroelectric power project in Azad Kashmir (AJK) designed to divert water from the Neelum River to a power station on the Jhelum River. Construction on the project began in 2008 after a Chinese consortium was awarded the construction contract in July 2007. After many years of delays, the first generator was commissioned in April 2018 and the entire project was completed in August 2018 when the fourth and last unit was synchronized with the national grid on 13 August and attained its maximum generation capacity of 969 MW on 14 August 2018. It will generate 5,150 GWh (gigawatt hour) per year at the levelised tariff of Rs 13.50 per unit for 30 years.Project is permanently closed since july 2022.

The plant had managed to reach 1040 MW production on a few occasions, which is beyond its capacity and a rare precedence in hydel power sector.

Background
After being approved in 1989, the design was improved, increasing the tunnel length and generation capacity. The project was intended to begin in 2002 and be completed in 2008 but this time-frame experienced significant delays due to problems meeting rising costs. Additionally, the 2005 Kashmir earthquake which devastated the region required a redesign of the project to conform to more stringent seismic standards.

On 7 July 2007, the China consortium CGGC-CMEC (Gezhouba Group and China National Machinery Import and Export Corporation) were offered a contract to construct the dam and power station. Terms were settled by the end of the year and in January 2008, the letter of commencement was issued. On 8 February, Pakistan's President Pervez Musharraf announced that the project would begin. In October 2011, the diversion tunnel required to reroute the Neelum River around the dam site was completed.

On 1 November, Pakistan's Prime Minister Syed Yusuf Raza Gilani publicly stated his concern for the project's delay. At its appraisal in 1989, it was to cost $167 million USD (2011) and after another redesign in 2005, that cost rose to $935 million USD (2011). Currently costs have risen to $2.89 billion USD (2011). The project was constructed under the supervision of the Water and Power Development Authority (WAPDA) and funding was achieved through the Neelum Jhelum Hydropower Company, taxes, bond offerings, middle-eastern and Chinese banks. WAPDA successfully secured loans from a consortium of Chinese banks and from Middle East. Tunnel-boring machines (TBM) were brought to help speed up the excavation of the remaining tunnels. They became operational in February 2013. The project was 66 percent complete as of August 2013 while at the same time the diversion tunnel was 75 percent complete. US$475 million in funding was still not secured by the Economic Affairs Division at that time. In mid-2014, Prime Minister Nawaz Sharif visited the construction site and expressed the hope that at least one generator would be operational by mid-2015. On 24 December 2014 a wall near the diversion tunnel's intake collapsed, killing four workers including a Chinese engineer. On 5 November 2016, the project entered into terminal phase with 100 percent perfect design while achieving 85.5 percent progress and is heading towards completion despite all delays in release of funds, weather conditions, non-availability of power during early stage of construction and delays in land acquisition.

In March 2017, it was reported that the cost of the dam had escalated to PKR 500 billion. thus the cost of electricity from Neelum Jhelum will be Pakistani Rupees 20 per unit.

All the civil work including tunnel boring, installation of generators and turbines was completed and water filling of the dam began on 17 October 2017 to put it on the test.

In October 2017, residents of Muzaffarabad expressed serious concerns that the commissioning of Neelum Jhelum project will drastically reduce the flow of Neelum river thru Muzaffarabad town.

In January 2018, it was reported that the retaining wall of the rock filled dam has got shifted by 18mm from its original position in Nov 2017 when the dam was loaded to design height of 1017 meter. The electricity generation from the dam may be delayed to June–July 2018.

In early March 2018, it was reported that the filling of water in the head race tunnel has started and the first unit will start electricity generation by end-March, followed by the second, third and fourth units at one month intervals respectively and was shut down on 7th July, 2022 

In April 2018, the first unit of 242.25 MW was commissioned at a levelised tariff of Rs 13.50 per unit.

The strategically crucial Neelum-Jhelum Hydropower Project achieved a historic landmark, as the project attained its maximum generation capacity of 969 megawatts (MW) on 14 August 2018. All units of the project are no longer generating power to their maximum capacity.

Impact of India's Kishanganga Project
 
In 2007, India began construction of a run of the river power station on the Neelum River (called Kishanganga in India) upstream of the  Neelum–Jhelum Dam. The Kishanganga Hydroelectric Plant operates in a similar way to the  Neelum–Jhelum, using a dam to divert a portion of the Neelum waters to a power station before it is discharged into Bonar Nalla, another tributary of Jhelum. Pakistan has estimated that, as a result of the Kishanganga project, it would experience a 21 percent reduction in the waters of Neelum in Pakistan, causing a 10 percent reduction in the power generated by Neelum–Jhelum. The reduction is not significant because 70 percent of the waters of Neelum were generated within Pakistan-administered Kashmir.

In 2010, Pakistan raised a dispute under the Indus Waters Treaty, taking it to the Permanent Court of Arbitration. The court ruled that India was permitted to divert waters from one tributary to another for power generation, and it had priority as it started the Kishanganga project before Neelum–Jhelum.

The Kishanganga project became operational on 19 May 2018. The Neelum-Jhelum dam was shut down due to major cracks in the tail-race tunnel.

Design and operation
From the surge chamber, the water is split into four different penstocks which feed each of the four 242 MW Francis turbine-generators in the underground power house. The tail race tunnel of the dam cracked, collapsed and got blocked in July 2022 leading to the shutdown of the power plant.

Corruption allegations
It is alleged that the procurement of TBM machines resulted in $74 million in kickbacks, according to Transparency International Pakistan.

See also 

 List of dams and reservoirs in Pakistan
 List of power stations in Pakistan
 Satpara Dam
 Allai Khwar Hydropower Project
 Gomal Zam Dam
 Tarbela Dam

References

Dams in Pakistan
Hydroelectric power stations in Pakistan
Run-of-the-river power stations
Dams on the Neelum (Kishanganga) River
Buildings and structures in Azad Kashmir
Gravity dams
Underground power stations